Ruffin is an unincorporated community located in Rockingham County, North Carolina. It is northeast of Reidsville, North Carolina, and southwest of Danville, Virginia, just off US 29 (future Interstate 785). It has a population of 419.

Neighboring communities and municipalities include Reidsville, Eden, Pelham, Casville, and Wentworth. Ruffin had the first established volunteer fire department in Rockingham County. Residents produce tobacco, vegetables and strawberries. The area also had a gold mine. Churches in the community include Ruffin United Methodist Church and Ruffin-Stacey Baptist Church.

With the completion of the vital Piedmont Railroad by the Confederate Government in early 1864, the village of Ruffin experienced steady growth. Subsequently, Ruffin became an important center of trade for both Rockingham and Caswell counties. Yet substantial growth and commerce were to elude Ruffin. Instead the prosperity was to find a home in a smaller crossroads hamlet to the south by the name of Reidsville. Tradition relates that growth in Ruffin was doomed because the large local landowners wanted to remain just that. Consequently, a booming town could not develop. From 1887-1897 though, Ruffin was incorporated with its own mayor. The last mayor of Ruffin was Victor M. Holderby, who was an active member of the Ruffin Methodist Episcopal Church, South.

The community is named after Thomas Ruffin (1787–1870) an American jurist and Justice of the North Carolina Supreme Court from 1829 to 1852 and again from 1858 to 1859. He was Chief Justice of that Court from 1833 to 1852. He lived in the community for a short while.

On April 15, 2018, Ruffin was struck by an EF1 tornado which was part of a larger outbreak across the southeast.

References 

Unincorporated communities in Rockingham County, North Carolina
Unincorporated communities in North Carolina